The Articles of Capitulation on the Reduction of New Netherland was a document of surrender signed on September 29, 1664  handing control of the Dutch Republic's colonial province New Netherland to the Kingdom of England.

Director-General Peter Stuyvesant conceded two days later to the capture of New Amsterdam by Richard Nicolls, who would become the first Governor of the Province of New York.

The lead negotiator for the Dutch side was Stuyvesant's lawyer Johannes de Decker. Negotiated at Stuyvesant Farm, the articles of surrender were signed by De Decker on an English ship in the harbor. De Decker negotiated the articles of surrender which included many legal rights and freedoms for residents of the province, as a sort of bill of rights. Many of these legal rights were later included in the Declaration of Independence and the American constitution.

There were 12 signatories: six representing the English and New England colonies and six representing the Council of New Netherland, the West India Company and New Netherlanders.

The terms were mostly adhered to by the English in the remainder of the conquest of New Netherland, with the notable exception of the mistreatment of Dutch prisoners of war at New Amstel.

Signatories
English side:
Sir Robert Carr (officer)
George Cartwright (officer)
John Winthrop (Connecticut)
Samuel Willys, (Connecticut)
Thomas Clarke (Massachusetts)
John Pincheon (Massachusetts)

Dutch side:
Johannes de Decker (Council of New Netherland)
Nicholas Verleet  (Council of New Netherland)
Samuel Megapolensis (Council of New Netherland)
Cornelius Steenwyk (burgomaster)
Oloff Stevense van Cortlandt (burgomaster)
Jaams Cousseau (schepen).

Text

See also
Flushing Remonstrance

References

External links
The surrender of New Netherland, 1664: A Spotlight on a Primary Source by Richard Nicholls, Gilder Lehrman Collection

https://www.wdl.org/en/item/4062/view/1/1/ Dutch

1664 documents
1664 in military history
1664 in the Dutch Empire
1664 in the Province of New York
Documents of New Netherland
Thirteen Colonies documents
Surrenders
Second Anglo-Dutch War